Gehrke Lake is a lake in the U.S. state of Washington. 

Gehrke Lake was named after Albert Gehrke, a pioneer settler.

References

Lakes of Thurston County, Washington